ERDRP-0519 is an antiviral drug which is the first drug specifically developed to target the measles morbillivirus. It acts as an inhibitor of the viral enzyme RNA polymerase which is essential for viral replication, and in animal studies showed good oral bioavailability and protected ferrets from otherwise lethal doses of a morbillivirus when administered up to three days after infection.

History 
The research was done at Georgia State University and the Paul Ehrlich Institute.

See also
 Favipiravir
 JK-05
 Sofosbuvir

References

Antiviral drugs
Experimental drugs
Trifluoromethyl compounds
Pyrazoles
Sulfonamides
4-Morpholinyl compunds
Anilides
Piperidines